Black Seeds is the third studio album by The Main Ingredient. Released in 1971 this is the last album to feature original lead singer Donald McPherson who had suddenly taken ill with leukaemia, and died unexpectedly not long before the album's release. It was then dedicated to him.

Track listing

Personnel
Bert De Coteaux - arranger, conductor
Grover Helsley, Jim Crotty - engineer

Charts

Singles

References

External links
 

1971 albums
The Main Ingredient (band) albums
RCA Records albums